St Peter Parish is one of the 57 parishes of Cumberland County, New South Wales, a cadastral unit for use on land titles. Its eastern boundary is the Georges River. It is named after St Peters Anglican church, the oldest building in Campbelltown.

References

 
 Parish of St. Peter, County of Cumberland, NLA
 New South Wales Parish maps preservation project

Parishes of Cumberland County
1835 establishments in Australia